Kauai High School is a public high school located in Lihue, Hawaii. It is named after the island Kauai and is a part of the Hawaii Department of Education.

Kauaʻi High School serves students from ninth through twelfth grades. It was the first public high school on the island of Kauaʻi and has a rich history, a wide variety of programs and many notable alumni. It began operating in 1914 and graduated its first class, consisting of one out of seven students, in 1919. Since then, the school has grown each year with an increasing number of students.

History 
The hill above Nāwiliwili was called Ke Kuhiau, which translates as "high point," and it was one of three heiau located near Kalapakī Bay. The residence of Governor Paul Kanoa stood there before annexation, and later it became the courthouse and county offices. When new county buildings were built on Rice Street, Kauaʻi High School was established on top of the hill.

Kauaʻi High School was founded in 1914.  On April 30, 1913, The Governor of the Territory of Hawaii signed into law Act 160 to establish "the Kauai High School."  On September 14, 1914, Kauaʻi High School opened its doors in the renovated courthouse as the 
fifth high school of the Territory of Hawaii and the first high school on the island of Kauaʻi.

The securing of this site and plant for high school purposes was brought about mainly by the efforts of the parents who had been supporting the private school in the yard of the Lihue Union Church. The high school was organized as a public institution. This made it available for all eligible students throughout the county. In addition the old private school was affiliated with the high school and partly maintained by tuition fees paid by those who attended: hence the name, Kauai High and Grammar School.

When Kauaʻi High School opened in 1914, it was just a little over a month after the outbreak of World War I. There were seven in attendance that year. Only one of these remained to graduate. The next year seven more entered. For each of the following three years, about twice that number came in. In 1919, 29 entered.  Seven students graduated in 1919; numbers climbed to about 100 per class in the 1930s. During the '20s and '30s, some students lived in private dormitories, bungalows were built as classes were added, sports were introduced and students enjoyed dances and theatrical performances. The original school building was torn down in 1931, and the gym (still in use today) was built in 1939.

The '60s was a time when students were encouraged to "do your own thing," and Kauaʻi High was a part of that approach to life. Clubs, activities and committees seemed limitless, and at Kauaʻi High School that was just the beginning. They had added numerous clubs, like the National Thespian Society, Explorer Post, Y-Club and lots more. Kauaʻi High School had about 190 seniors in the '60s. As the '70s rolled in, the school's senior class grew to 249 students, and more clubs, activities, sports and classes were added. A homemade dynamite bomb was found in the "K" building boys' restroom and fortunately was defused. The old "A" building was torn down, and there were plans to build a new, two-story, 12-classroom building. In the 1970s they built the cafeteria, library, administration building, "K" building and the swimming pool.

Kauaʻi High greeted the '80s after a statewide, six-week strike that left classrooms uncleaned, lunches unprepared and, later, the school unopened. The decade also started with the construction of "A" building. The new "A" building was much needed; the 11-classroom building would house new special classrooms designed for science, business, and home economics.

In 1998 the six-period day was abandoned in favor of block scheduling, and in 2000 the intermediate grades went to Chiefess Kamakahelei Middle School. Since then, there has been no new construction, but in 2003 the campus was given a facelift.

On March 1 2021, a groundbreaking ceremony was held at Kaua‘i High School for a new gymnasium. Nicknamed "The Roost," the $21 million project began its initial conception in 2011, with the help of John Hara Associates, Inc., and is estimated to be completed by the Fall of 2023. The new gymnasium will seat 1,600 spectators, approximately double the number of seats the current gymnasium holds.

Campus 

The campus sits on approximately four acres off Lala Road and has sweeping views of Kalapakī Bay and Nāwiliwili Harbor.  Among the facilities are an athletic field, gym, and swimming pool.

The campus also boasts the bronze sculpture Reflections by Bumpei Akaji, the resin relief mural The Struggle by Joseph Hadley, the ceramic fountain Ka Hoo Mau by Wayne Miyata, and the mixed media sculpture Kauai Ola by Ken Shutt.

Vision 
The school emphasizes a student-centered educational program that nurtures students and recognizes that students have different interests, cultures/religions and learning rates.

"Our students will be prepared for the challenges of their future by becoming LITERATE, RESPONSIBLE, and CONTRIBUTING members of society."

Co-curricular and extracurricular activities

Sports 
The Kauaʻi High School Red Raiders are members of the Kauai Interscholastic Federation (KIF) and compete in the following sports:

HHSAA Championships 
 2017 Baseball (Division II)
 2011 Baseball (Division II)
 2009 Softball (Division II)
 2008 Baseball (Division II)
 2005 Boys Golf
 2004 Boys Golf
 2004 Girls Golf
 2001 Girls Golf
 1995 Boys Bowling
 1989 Boys Golf
 1981 Boys Bowling
 1979 Boys Golf
 1978 Boys Bowling
 1958 Girls Tennis

Mock trial 
In 2005, the school's mock trial team finished second in the National High School Mock Trial Championship, held in Charlotte, North Carolina.
In 2012, the mock trial team traveled to New York to compete in the international competition, Empire Mock Trial. The team was led by coaches Aric Fujii and Ted Chihara.

Clubs 
 Key Club is supported through the Kauaʻi Kiwanis Organization. The Club provides school and community service through various activities (e.g. Trick-or-Treat for UNICEF, tutoring, Key Kids, and highway and beach cleanup). A convention is held every February, where the various Key Clubs across the state of Hawaii come together to learn, bond, and participate in various service projects.  The Kauaʻi High School Key Club is also internationally recognized as a "Diamond Distinguished Key Club". Out of over 5,000 Key Clubs Worldwide less than 100 are given this prestigious award.
 Leo Club is sponsored by the Kauaʻi's Lions Club. The club's name is based on the acronym of their motto, "Leadership, Experience and Opportunity". Student members are provided with the chance to contribute and serve their community. Activities generally include participation and assistance in local events on Kauai (e.g. Zonta's Eat Dessert First, Kauai Keiki Story Festival, Easter Seals)
 Academy of Hospitality and Tourism (AOHT) is a part of the National Academy Foundation. It provides students with the opportunity to learn and explore careers in the tourism and hospitality industry through its classes, activities and internships.
 Health Occupations Students of America (HOSA) provides career opportunities in health care, to enhance the delivery of quality health care to all interested students.
 National Honor Society is a select group of sophomores, juniors, and seniors that are chosen by an anonymous group of teachers.
 Academy of Health is designed for students who plan to pursue careers in the health service industry such as nurses, surgeons, and doctors.
 Nature Club dedicates its time to exploring, preserving and protecting Earth's environment. The club participates in various hikes, clean-ups, and beautification projects.
 Yearbook (Ke Kuhiau) is a group of students and parents come together every year to create the school's annual that captures all of the events that took place throughout the school year.
 Newspaper Editors (Making Waves) provides a safe refuge for individuals studying journalism, and creating newspapers and editorials.
 Japanese Club provides school and community service through various activities in an effort to help preserve the Japanese culture.
 Skills USA provides careers in repair of automobiles. The club raises funds to earn money to go on its yearly trip to compete with other Skills USA clubs around the country.
 Band consists of "Jazz Raiderz", percussion, concert band, symphonic band, wind ensemble, and ukulele. The world premiere of "Sondios de Guerra," a suite by Trysten J. Fernandes Caberto, was played in 2013 by the Kauaʻi High School Band.
 Power Lunch is a student-led gathering held at the end of every week. Students are provided with an opportunity to hear words of encouragement from the Bible spoken by fellow students and other speakers. Students are also provided with food generously donated and bought by various churches on Kauaʻi.
 Dance Club provides various activities that allow each club member to express their creativity through the art of dance. The club performs during school assemblies and sports events.

Popularity contests 
The Kauaʻi High School Student Government sponsors and hosts popularity contests throughout the school year (Homecoming, Winter Assembly and Ball, May Day, and Prom).

The Homecoming Court and Winter Court have five Queen Candidates that are voted by the entire student body and four Class Representatives that are elected by each grade level.

The May Day Court has a King, Queen, two Ladies-in-Waiting and their escorts (runners-up for King and Queen), two conch blowers, and a Kahuna, which are elected by the entire student body.  Each grade level elects two Class Attendants, two escorts, and two Kahili Bearers.

The Prom Court is elected at Prom. The King and Queen are voted on by all Senior and Junior attendees. The Senior Prince and Princess and Junior Prince and Princess are elected by their respective grade levels.

A girl may only be a Queen Candidate (elected by the entire Student Body) one time. A girl may only be a Class Attendant (elected by her respective grade level) once a school year and may not be a Class Attendant for the same event twice. Only Seniors are allowed to run for the King and Queen titles.

 Senior class represents the Big Island and Maui
 Junior class represents Oʻahu and Kauaʻi
 Sophomore Class represents Molokaʻi and Lānaʻi
 Freshmen Class represent Niʻihau and Kahoʻolawe

A candidate's vote totals determine which island he/she represents; the larger island is represented by the candidate with the most votes.

Notable alumni
 Sonya Balmores (2004) Miss Teen USA runner-up (2004), actress, model
 Micah Solusod (2008) voice actor and artist
 Spark Matsunaga (1934) United States Senator 1977 - 1990, House of Representatives 1963 - 1977
 Eric Shinseki (1960) US Army 4-star general, Joint Chiefs of Staff 1999 - 2003, 34th Army Chief of Staff, 7th US Secretary of Veterans Affairs
 David Ishii (1973) professional golfer, 1990 Hawaiian Open champion, 1990 Masters tournament participant, 1988 US Open, British Open, and PGA Championship participant
 Val Okimoto member of Hawaii House of Representatives
 Guy Yamamoto (1979) golfer, 1994 United States Amateur Public Links champion, 1995 Masters tournament participant
 Dain Kane (1980) University of Hawaiʻi swimming team member, Politician, Maui County Councilmember 1999 - 2006
 Bernard Soriano (1980) University of California, Davis college football player, NASA astronaut finalist, California state government official
 Glenn Medeiros (1988) recording artist, President, St. Louis School, (announced April 23, 2015)
 Tyler Yates (1995) Major League Baseball player (New York Mets, Atlanta Braves, Pittsburgh Pirates)
 Kirby Yates (2005) Major League Baseball player (Tampa Bay Rays, New York Yankees, San Diego Padres)

References

Further reading 
 Kauai High School Alumni Directory 2002, William McCluskey, Principal (1918–1921).

External links 
 Kauai High School Foundation
 New School Site in the Works
 Kauai High School Key Club
 Kauai High School Leo Club

Educational institutions established in 1914
Public high schools in Kauai County, Hawaii
1914 establishments in Hawaii